Ratlinghope is a civil parish in Shropshire, England.  It contains eight listed buildings that are recorded in the National Heritage List for England.  All the listed buildings are designated at Grade II, the lowest of the three grades, which is applied to "buildings of national importance and special interest".  The parish contains the village of Ratlinghope and smaller settlements and is otherwise rural.  The listed buildings are varied, and consist of a former manor house, a smaller house, a farmhouse, a church, a public house, a milestone, a former coach house and a former smithy.


Buildings

References

Citations

Sources

Lists of buildings and structures in Shropshire